Valon Zumberi (born 24 November 2002) is a professional footballer who plays as a centre-back for German side Hamburger SV. Born in Germany, he is a youth international for Kosovo.

Club career

Hamburger SV

First season at second team
On 1 April 2021, Zumberi continues his contract with Hamburger SV for another two years. In July 2021, he was officially promoted to Hamburger SV's second team competing in the Regionalliga Nord. On 15 August 2021, he made his debut with second team in a 2–4 home defeat against SV Drochtersen/Assel after being named in the starting line-up. Three days after debut, Zumberi scored his first goal for second team in his second appearance for the club in a 1–0 away win over St. Pauli II in Regionalliga Nord.

Promotion to the senior team
On 6 July 2022, Zumberi signed his first professional contract with 2. Bundesliga side Hamburger SV after agreeing to a two-year deal. On 8 October 2022, he was named as a Hamburger SV substitute for the first time in a league match against 1. FC Kaiserslautern. His debut with Hamburger SV came on 12 November in a 4–2 home win against SV Sandhausen after coming on as a substitute at 85th minute in place of Ransford-Yeboah Königsdörffer.

International career
Since 2017, Zumberi is part of Kosovo at youth international level, respectively part of the U17 and U21 teams and he with these teams played twenty matches and scored one goal. On 30 May 2022, he received a call-up from the senior team for training session before the 2022–23 UEFA Nations League matches against Cyprus, Greece and Northern Ireland, but did not make the final squad.

Personal life
Zumberi was born in Hamburg, Germany to Kosovan parents from Preševo.

References

2002 births
Living people
Sportspeople from Hamburg
Kosovan footballers
Kosovo youth international footballers
Kosovo under-21 international footballers
German footballers
German people of Kosovan descent
German people of Albanian descent
Association football central defenders
Regionalliga players
Hamburger SV II players
2. Bundesliga players
Hamburger SV players